Rodrigo Rey (born 8 March 1991) is an Argentine professional footballer who plays as a goalkeeper for Argentine Primera División club Independiente.

Career
Rey came out of the youth development academy of the Club Atlético River Plate and developed a passion for the sport from an early age. His skills and abilities was the reason to be called in the  Argentina U20 for the 2011 FIFA U-20 World Cup at Colombia. River faced difficult times when the club faced a shameful relegation to the second tier league. Coaches experimented with various goalies who would replace legendary Juan Pablo Carrizo. Having few chances to be part of the starting XI, along with the fact that the River decided to buy Marcelo Barovero for $2 million, Rey signed as a free transfer, with Newell's Old Boys in the summer of 2012. 
In Newell's Old Boys, he had to compete for a starting position against Nahuel Guzmán one of the best goalies in the country, making the competition for starting goalie was made even more difficult due to the club competing for the title in Primera División which they won that year with coaching staff deciding Guzmán was irreplaceable. He knew well that the only solution to get playing time was to join a team other than a top club. With a steady role in a rather smaller club, he chose Godoy Cruz, a team with moderate success in the Argentine league in modern history. 

On 7 July 2017, Rodrigo Rey signed a three-year contract with Superleague club PAOK, for an estimated transfer fee of €1.5 million. The administration of the Greek Cup winners decided to sign the 26-year-old Argentine goalkeeper instead of experienced Mexican international Guillermo Ochoa, because he was younger and there is also a strong chance Ochoa would be called up in his motherland's national team soon.  On 27 July 2017, he made his debut in an away 1-1 draw for the 1st leg of UEFA Europa League third qualifying round against Olimpik Donetsk.
On 28 May 2019, after a prolific season with the club, but as second goalie after the undisputed first goalkeeper Alexandros Paschalakis, he signed a year contract as a loanee with Liga MX club Pachuca despite the interest of other Argentinian clubs.
However, this loan was cut short on 16 January 2020, as Rey was announced at Godoy Cruz after signing a new 6-month loan deal.

On 8 February 2021, Rey signed with Argentine Primera División side Gimnasia, keeping him with the club until December 2022.

Honours
PAOK
Super League Greece: 2018–19
Greek Cup: 2017–18, 2018–19

References

External links 
 

1991 births
Living people
Argentine footballers
Argentine expatriate footballers
Association football goalkeepers
Argentina under-20 international footballers
Club Atlético River Plate footballers
Newell's Old Boys footballers
Godoy Cruz Antonio Tomba footballers
PAOK FC players
C.F. Pachuca players
Club de Gimnasia y Esgrima La Plata footballers
Argentine Primera División players
Super League Greece players
Liga MX players
Argentine expatriate sportspeople in Greece
Argentine expatriate sportspeople in Mexico
Expatriate footballers in Greece
Expatriate footballers in Mexico
Sportspeople from Santa Fe Province
Footballers at the 2011 Pan American Games
Pan American Games silver medalists for Argentina
Pan American Games medalists in football
Medalists at the 2011 Pan American Games